Antonio Marin (born 9 January 2001) is a Croatian professional footballer who plays for Prva HNL club Rijeka, on loan from Dinamo Zagreb. A versatile forward, Marin is capable of playing as either a winger, a second striker, or a striker.

He has represented Croatia internationally from under-15 to under-21 level.

Club career

Dinamo Zagreb
Born in Zagreb, Marin started his youth career with ZET, before signing for the academy of Dinamo Zagreb in 2009. In spite of being strongly linked to Milan, Manchester City, Paris Saint-Germain and Juventus in September 2017, he signed a three-year long professional contract with the club on 9 October 2017. On 19 May 2018, he made his first team debut, replacing Petar Stojanović in a 3–1 victory over Inter Zaprešić.

On 12 March 2019, in a UEFA Youth League round of 16 game against Liverpool, he provided Leon Šipoš with an assist for the equalizer. The game ended as a 1–1 draw and saw Dinamo win 5–4 on penalties. On 3 April, in a quarter-final against Chelsea, he netted a brace to put Dinamo two up; however, Chelsea came from behind with Luke McCormick's brace and defeated Dinamo 4–2 on penalties. On 11 December, in another Youth League campaign, he scored the only goal in a 1–0 victory over Manchester City and secured Dinamo's spot in the play-offs.

After the departure of Dani Olmo in January 2020, Marin inherited his number 7 shirt. On 6 June 2020, he scored his first senior goal for Dinamo in a 3–1 win over Varaždin.

Loan to Monza
On 1 October 2020, Marin was sent on a one-year loan to newly-promoted Serie B side Monza, with an option for purchase which becomes an obligation under certain conditions. He made his debut on 7 November, coming on as a substitute for Dany Mota in a 2–0 home victory over Frosinone. His loan ended in January 2021, as he was dissatisfied with his playtime.

Loan to Lokomotiva
On 4 February 2021, he moved on loan to Lokomotiva.

Style of play
Although Marin generally plays as a winger, his versatility in attack makes him adept both as a second striker and a striker. He is known for his speed, dribbling abilities and skill in set pieces.

Personal life 
On 13 October 2020, Marin tested positive for COVID-19.

Career statistics

Club

Honours
Dinamo Zagreb
 Prva HNL: 2017–18, 2018–19, 2019–20
 Croatian Cup: 2017–18
 Croatian Super Cup: 2019

References

External links
 Profile  at the Dinamo Zagreb website
 
 
 

2001 births
Living people
Footballers from Zagreb
Association football wingers
Association football forwards
Croatian footballers
Croatia youth international footballers
Croatia under-21 international footballers
GNK Dinamo Zagreb players
GNK Dinamo Zagreb II players
A.C. Monza players
NK Lokomotiva Zagreb players
HNK Šibenik players
HNK Rijeka players
Croatian Football League players
First Football League (Croatia) players
Serie B players
Croatian expatriate footballers
Croatian expatriate sportspeople in Italy
Expatriate footballers in Italy